The Tipton & Coseley Building Society is a UK building society, which has its head office in Tipton, West Midlands. It is a member of the Building Societies Association. Its headquarters are in Owen Street, Tipton town centre, where they had been based since relocating from a building in High Street in August 1992.

External links
Tipton & Coseley Building Society
Building Societies Association
KPMG Building Societies Database 2008
[www.tiptoncivicsociety.co.uk/brief-history-of-tipton.php]

Building societies of England
Banks established in 1901
Organizations established in 1901
Organisations based in the West Midlands (county)
1901 establishments in England